RTNC Congo Building is a skyscraper in Kinshasa, DRC. The 22 story building houses the headquarters of Radio-Télévision nationale congolaise. It is located on Avenue Pierre Mulele.

See also
 Skyscraper design and construction
 List of tallest buildings in Africa

References

Buildings and structures in Kinshasa